Macclesfield College is a Further Education College in Macclesfield, Cheshire which primarily offers BTEC and NVQ qualifications. The college is noted within the local area as an aerospace engineering college as it used to possess a Jetstream Super 31 for its aerospace engineering students.

The college principal is Rachel Kay with Lucy Reed as the assistant principal. The college currently has an Ofsted rating of Good.

Macclesfield College is situated on the Learning Zone campus, other establishments on the site include The Macclesfield Academy Park Lane School and Macclesfield Tennis Club.

The Learning Zone campus is situated on the A536 in Macclesfield providing good links to Congleton, Poynton and the M6. The campus is also a 20 minute walk from the town centre and Macclesfield railway station

There is also 2 bus stops outside the campus with a half-hourly bus service to Congleton, Sandbach and Crewe. The buses are operated by D&G Bus & Arriva North West

External links
Official website

Buildings and structures in the Borough of Cheshire East
Further education colleges in Cheshire
Learning and Skills Beacons
Education in the Borough of Cheshire East
Macclesfield